The Decatur Junction Railway  is a Class III railroad which operates in the state of Illinois. It is one of several short-line railroads owned by Pioneer Railcorp.

On September 23, 1993, the Decatur Junction Railway Co. (DT) signed a lease agreement for the lease rights of two segments of track in east central Illinois from Assumption to Cisco owned by a consortium of grain dealers. The railroad's principal commodities are grain, fertilizer and plastics.

The change in operators left the Decatur Junction with a  line running from Elwin, near Decatur, south to Assumption.

References

External links
 Official site

Switching and terminal railroads
Illinois railroads
Pioneer Lines
Standard gauge railways in the United States